The Rugby was a brand of automobiles assembled by the Durant Motors Company of New York City, New York (USA). Beside badges and right-hand drive for some models, the vehicle was identical to Durant's Star car, and was assigned to export markets by Durant Motors, due to the name Star being under copyright by the Star Motor Company in the British Commonwealth.

History 
The Rugby was built from 1923 based on the Star car and production ended in 1928 together with the Star.  The Star name was changed to Durant and all 4-cylinder Durants exported carried the Rugby name until the end of the Durant line in Canada in 1932.

Commercial cars were marketed based on the Rugby. Some Durant commercial vehicles were badged Rugby's and sold in the US for 1928.  Commercial trucks from January 1928 were Rugby's to the end of production in 1933 at Dominion Motors in Leaside. The last remaining US plant in 1931 was Lansing which stopped in August 1931. Leaside became Canadian owned in January 1931, as Dominon Motors, Ltd. and they chose to continue the Durant into 1932 and Rugby into 1933.

REO cars were also built there beginning in 1932. In August 1931, Dominion made the Canadian Frontenac car to the end of 1933.  All production stopped in December 1933.  The company charter was finally surrendered in 1944.

Production of the Rugby occurred at the following plants:
 Elizabeth, New Jersey (Star and Rugby)
 Lansing, Michigan (Star and Rugby)
 Long Island City, New York (Star)
 Oakland, California (Star and Rugby)
 Leaside (Toronto), Canada (Star and Rugby)

External links 
 Homepage of the Durant Motors Automobile Club
 The Rugby catalog at Durant Cars

References 

Defunct motor vehicle manufacturers of the United States
Defunct motor vehicle manufacturers of Canada
Vehicle manufacturing companies established in 1924
Vehicle manufacturing companies disestablished in 1933
Durant Motors
Vintage vehicles
Pre-war vehicles
1920s cars
1930s cars
Cars introduced in 1924